The 2010 Indonesia Open Superseries was a top level badminton competition held from 22 to 27 June 2010 in Jakarta, Indonesia. It was the fifth BWF Superseries competition on the 2010 BWF Superseries schedule. The total purse for the event is $250,000.

Men's singles

Seeds
 Lee Chong Wei (champion)
 Taufik Hidayat (final)
 Nguyen Tien Minh (semifinals)
 Boonsak Ponsana (first round)
 Jan Ø. Jørgensen (first round)
 Simon Santoso (quarterfinals)
 Sony Dwi Kuncoro (semifinals)
 Kenichi Tago (quarterfinals)

Finals

Top half

Section 1

Section 2

Bottom half

Section 3

Section 4

Women's singles

Seeds
 Saina Nehwal (champions)
 Pi Hong Yan (withdrew)
 Zhou Mi (first round)
 Eriko Hirose (semifinals)
 Yao Jie (quarterfinals)
 Bae Seung-hee (withdrew)
 Yip Pui Yin (quarterfinals)
 Ella Diehl (quarterfinals)

Finals

Top half

Section 1

Section 2

Bottom half

Section 3

Section 4

Men's doubles

Seeds
 Koo Kien Keat / Tan Boon Heong (quarterfinals)
 Markis Kido / Hendra Setiawan (second round)
 Chen Hung-ling / Lin Yu-lang (first round)
 Choong Tan Fook / Lee Wan Wah (second round)
 Howard Bach / Tony Gunawan (quarterfinals)
 Hirokatsu Hashimoto / Noriyasu Hirata (semifinals)
 Gan Teik Chai / Tan Bin Shen (second round)
 Kim Ki-jung / Shin Baek-cheol (quarterfinals)

Finals

Top half

Section 1

Section 2

Bottom half

Section 3

Section 4

Women's doubles

Seeds
 Miyuki Maeda / Satoko Suetsuna (semifinals)
 Mizuki Fujii / Reika Kakiiwa (second round)
 Petya Nedelcheva /  Anastasia Russkikh (second round)
 Cheng Wen-Hsing / Chien Yu-Chin (final)
 Kim Min-jung / Lee Hyo-jung (champions)
 Savitree Amitrapai / Vacharaporn Munkit (quarterfinals)
 Ha Jung-eun / Jung Kyung-eun (quarterfinals)
 Shizuka Matsuo / Mami Naito (second round)

Finals

Top half

Section 1

Section 2

Bottom half

Section 3

Section 4

Mixed doubles

Seeds
 Nova Widianto / Liliyana Natsir (semifinals)
 Thomas Laybourn / Kamilla Rytter Juhl (quarterfinals)
 Robert Mateusiak / Nadieżda Zięba (champions)
 Songphon Anugritayawan / Kunchala Voravichitchaikul (second round)
 Shin Baek-cheol / Lee Hyo-jung (second round)
 Nathan Robertson / Jenny Wallwork (second round)
 Ko Sung-hyun / Ha Jung-eun (semifinals)
 Sudket Prapakamol / Saralee Thoungthongkam (quarterfinals)

Finals

Top half

Section 1

Section 2

Bottom half

Section 3

Section 4

References

External links
Indonesia Open Super Series 2010 at tournamentsoftware.com

Indonesia Open (badminton)
Indonesia Super Series, 2010
Sports competitions in Jakarta
Indonesia